f2c is a program to convert Fortran 77 to C code, developed  at Bell Laboratories.  The standalone f2c program was based on the core of the first complete Fortran 77 compiler to be implemented, the "f77" program by Feldman and Weinberger.  Because the f77 compiler was itself written in C and relied on a C compiler back end to complete its final compilation step, it and its derivatives like f2c were much more portable than compilers generating machine code directly.

The f2c program was released as free software and subsequently became one of the most common means to compile Fortran code on many systems where native Fortran compilers were unavailable or expensive.  Several large Fortran libraries, such as LAPACK, were made available as C libraries via conversion with f2c.  The f2c program also influenced the development of the GNU g77 compiler, which uses a modified version of the f2c runtime libraries.

See also
BCX – translates BASIC source code to C/C++ source code

References 

 S. I. Feldman and P. J. Weinberger. A portable Fortran 77 compiler. In UNIX Time Sharing System Programmer's Manual, volume 2. AT&T Bell Laboratories, tenth edition, 1990.
 S. I. Feldman, David M. Gay, Mark W. Maimone, and N. L. Schryer, "A Fortran to C Converter," AT&T Bell Laboratories technical report, 1990.  Also the paper of the same title by S. I. Feldman, published in ACM SIGPLAN Fortran Forum, vol. 9, issue 2, p. 21–22 (1990).
 The f2c source code and documentation, at Netlib.

Fortran compilers
Compilers
Source-to-source compilers
C (programming language)
Free compilers and interpreters
Free software programmed in C